Weiting Station is the Eastern terminus of Line 3, Suzhou Rail Transit. The station is located in Suzhou Industrial Park, Jiangsu. It has been in use since December 25, 2019; when Line 3 first opened to the public. Upon completion of Line S1, the station will act as the Western terminus of the line.

References 

Railway stations in Jiangsu
Suzhou Rail Transit stations
Railway stations in China opened in 2019